Burr is an unincorporated community in Ripley County, in the U.S. state of Missouri.

History
A post office called Burr was established in 1898, and remained in operation until 1920. The community has the name of Moses Burr, a local merchant.

References

Unincorporated communities in Ripley County, Missouri
Unincorporated communities in Missouri